Cherokee County is the name of eight counties in the United States:

 Cherokee County, Alabama
 Cherokee County, Georgia
 Cherokee County, Iowa
 Cherokee County, Kansas
 Cherokee County, North Carolina
 Cherokee County, Oklahoma
 Cherokee County, South Carolina
 Cherokee County, Texas